The  is an electric multiple unit (EMU) commuter train type operated by the private railway operator Sagami Railway ("Sotetsu") in Japan in the Tokyo area since February 2018. Ultimately intended to be used on through-running services between Sotetsu and Tokyu Corporation lines commencing in late fiscal 2022, the first train entered revenue service on 11 February 2018, replacing a 7000 series set.

Eight-car sets designated as 21000 series were announced in April 2021, the first of which entered service in September 2021.

Design
The fleet of ten-car 20000 series trainsets is being built by Hitachi at its Kasado Factory in Kudamatsu, Yamaguchi. Externally, the trains carry the "Yokohama Navy Blue" corporate livery introduced for refurbished 9000 series trains.

Formation

20000 series
The trains are formed as ten-car sets, as follows, with five motored ("M") cars and five non-powered trailer ("T") cars, and car 1 at the Yokohama end.

21000 series
The trains are formed as eight-car sets with four motored ("M") cars and four non-powered trailer ("T") cars, and car 1 at the Yokohama end, as follows.

Interior
Passenger accommodation consists of longitudinal bench seating with grey moquette seat covers. Each car includes a space for wheelchairs and pushchairs.

The colour temperature of the interior LED lighting is adjusted automatically according to time of day and season as follows (hues shown are illustrative only).

History

Details of the new trains were officially announced in June 2017. The first train set was delivered from the Hitachi factory in Kudamatsu, Yamaguchi, in late July 2017.

Originally scheduled to enter revenue service in December 2017, scheduled service entry was subsequently postponed until 11 February 2018. In late August 2022, both the 20000 and 21000 received formation stickers located in the window of each head car before the beginning of service along the Sotetsu-Tokyu Link. These stickers will also help passengers distinguish how long each set is before boarding. Set 20103 was the first to receive a larger sticker displaying the last three digits of the Ebina bound head car of the set (eg, “003”). As of late October 2022, all sets have received formation stickers.

21000 series
An order of a short version of the 20000 series was announced on 28 April 2021. These four eight-car sets will be designated as 21000 series, and are to be operated through to lines of Tokyu Corporation. The first 21000 series set entered service on 6 September 2021. In late August 2022, the 21000 sets are being given stickers located at the end of each set to help passengers tell them apart from the identical 20000 series. In addition to formation number stickers (the last three digits of the Ebina bound head end car), they were also given “8-Cars” stickers as well, all of which was completed by late October 2022. Sotetsu had also announced an additional order for 9 more 21000 sets to help expand the fleet before service to Shin-Yokohama begins. As of November 2022, two sets (21105F and 21106F) have been delivered and entered service. It is planned that one more set (21107F) will be delivered before the end of the year 2022 while the remaining sets will be delivered in early 2023.

References

External links

  

Electric multiple units of Japan
20000 series
Train-related introductions in 2018
Hitachi multiple units
1500 V DC multiple units of Japan